Leogorgon ("Leo's gorgon") is a extinct genus of dubious therapsid from the Late Permian of Russia. It was originally classified as a rubidgeine gorgonopsian, and would have been the first member of that clade from outside of Africa if that identification had been valid. However, it may instead be a combination of the tooth of a gorgonopsian and the braincase of a dicynodont, and may be a wastebin taxon.

History

Leogorgon klimovensis was named in 2003 by the paleontologist Mikhail Ivakhnenko. The genus name honors the paleontologist Leonid Tatarinov. The holotype, PIN 4549/13, is a partial braincase from the Klimovo-1 locality in Vologda Oblast, Russia, and pertains to the Sokolki Faunal Assemblage. Ivakhnenko also referred an incisor tooth from the same locality to the new species. He interpreted the fossils as representing a large rubidgeine gorgonopsian, the first found outside of Africa, and noted that it was especially similar to Dinogorgon.

In 2008, however, Ivakhnenko noted that, due to its poorly known anatomy, Leogorgon could be a relative of the Russian Phthinosuchidae rather than the sole Russian representative of Rubidgeinae. In 2016, a rubidgeine identity was formally rejected by paleontologist Christian Kammerer, as the features which Ivakhnenko stated supported its assignment to Rubidgeinae are actually present in other gorgonopsians, and in fact the braincase has no uniquely gorgonopsian features at all and may be from a dicynodont. The referred incisor is from a gorgonopsian, but cannot be distinguished from incisors of the contemporaneous Inostrancevia. Recent evidence suggests that African gorgonopsians form an endemic group.

References 

Prehistoric therapsid genera
Lopingian synapsids of Europe
Permian Russia
Fossils of Russia
Nomina dubia
Fossil taxa described in 2003